Sincan (also, Sindzhan and Sindzhav) is a village and municipality in the Oghuz Rayon of Azerbaijan.  It has a population of 1,419. Its name is derived from the province of Xinjiang in China.

Much of the water supplied to Baku originates in wells at Sincan and is then transferred at 5 cubic metres per second through a 262.5km pipeline built at the cost of 779,600,000 manats (over half a billion US$).

References 

Populated places in Oghuz District